Oakhanger is a village in Cheshire, England, within the civil parish of Haslington and the Borough of Cheshire East, located off the B5077 road between Alsager and Crewe.

Oakhanger Moss
Oakhanger Moss is a Site of Special Scientific Interest SSSI covering 13.58ha.  English Nature reports that it was originally a mere within a glacial hollow; since the 17th century the water has become filled with vegetation creating a raised peat bog.  Adders can be found on the site.  Neighbouring sites such as White Moss have been excavated for commercial peat production.

See also
St Luke's Church, Oakhanger

External links

Villages in Cheshire